The Free Life is the third studio album by English hard rock band, Turbowolf. The album was released on 9 March 2018 through Silva Screen Records.

Track listing

References

External links 
 

2018 albums
Turbowolf albums